The Ven. Charles Fairfax  was a Church of Ireland priest in the first quarter of the 18th century.

Fairfax was educated at Westminster School and Christ Church, Oxford. He held livings at Barnham, Suffolk and Euston, Suffolk. He was Archdeacon of Clogher from 1716 to 1718;

Notes

18th-century Irish Anglican priests
Archdeacons of Clogher
1723 deaths
Alumni of Christ Church, Oxford
Clergy from London
People educated at Westminster School, London